Kyle William Hayde (born 25 September 2001) is an English professional footballer who plays as a defender for Marine.

Career
He made his Tranmere Rovers first team debut in a 2–1 defeat to Leicester City Under-21's in the 2019–20 EFL Trophy, and signed his first professional contract in July 2020.  The following season he made two appearances for the club in the 2020–21 EFL Trophy competition.

In September 2021 he joined Marine on loan for a month with the deal later extended until January 2022. He was recalled by Tranmere from this loan spell in December and went on to make his fourth appearance for the Tranmere in a 2021–22 EFL Trophy match.  In February 2022 he returned to Marine on loan for the rest of the season but was recalled in April.

In July 2022, Hayde joined Warrington Rylands for an undisclosed fee.

He rejoined Marine on a permanent basis in February 2023.

Career statistics

References

2001 births
Living people
English footballers
Association football defenders
Tranmere Rovers F.C. players
Marine F.C. players
Northern Premier League players